Lao khao or officially sura khao is a Thai distilled spirit.

History
According to Chinese source “Yingya Shenglan” (1405–1433), Hisen Lo had two kinds of spirits, both of which are distilled spirits. The French diplomat Simon de la Loubère, who visited Siam during the mid-Ayutthaya period, wrote about Siamese spirits:

In 1790, during the reign of King Rama I, Bangyikhan Liquor Distillery was known to have been established. At this time, spirits that made at the government distillery were called lao rong,. and the private distilleries that existed everywhere were declared illegal. In 1834, English sources mention that exports of Siam included white spirits distilled from glutinous rice. The name lao khao came into existence when lao si, including Mekhong, were made after World War II.

Distilling lao khao in Thailand must be licensed, under the Criminal Activities Act which was introduced in the 1950s. This regulation was passed after a spate of lao khao of poor quality being produced, which resulted in methanol related poisoning. The methanol was produced as a by-product of the spirits reacting with tin and aluminium stills used. The metals were switched out with stainless steel when the government took over all distilleries by 1960. The distilleries were then returned to civilian control as the government could not operate all of them. By 1984, only twelve distilleries were left. ThaiBev then took control of these twelve distilleries in 1985, forming a monopoly. In 2003, Thaksin Shinawatra fulfilled an election promise made during the 2001 Thai general election to let people produce the spirits with licenses, thus breaking the monopoly. However, licenses are hard to come by.

Most modern lao khao is distilled from molasses instead of rice to reduce production costs.

See also

 Thai wine
 Mekhong
 Sang Som
 Awamori
 Sato
 List of rice beverages

References

External links 
 Thai Beverage Plc
 Thai Alcohol Beverage Business Association
 The study of physical and chemical properties of Thai distilled spirits.
 ‘เหล้าขาวไทย’ ดีกรีไกลระดับโลก กับ Moon Seeker
 Thai Beverage Company
 แจกสูตรคอกเทลอโยธยาที่คุณพี่หมื่นสายเมาชอบไปดริงค

Rice drinks
Thai distilled drinks
Distilled drinks
Alcoholic drinks
Thai cuisine